The American School of Classical Studies at Athens (ASCSA) is one of 19 foreign archaeological institutes in Athens, Greece.
It is a member of the Council of American Overseas Research Centers (CAORC). CAORC is a private not-for-profit federation of independent overseas research centers that promote advanced research, particularly in the humanities and social sciences, with focus on the conservation and recording of cultural heritage and the understanding and interpretation of modern societies.

General information
With an administrative base in Princeton, New Jersey, and a campus in Athens, the American School of Classical Studies at Athens is one of the leading American research and teaching institutions in Greece, dedicated to the advanced study of all aspects of Greek culture, from antiquity to the present. Founded in 1881, the School is a consortium of nearly 200 colleges and universities in the United States and Canada. It was the first American overseas research center, and today it is the largest of the eighteen foreign institutes in Athens. It also provides the opportunity for students and scholars from around the world to explore the full range of scholarly resources in Greece. The American School operates excavations in the Athenian Agora and Ancient Corinth, two distinguished libraries, an archaeological science laboratory, and a prolific publications department. The School remains, as its founders envisioned, primarily a privately funded, nonprofit educational and cultural institution.

Mission and governance
The mission of the ASCSA is to advance knowledge of Greece in all periods by training young scholars, sponsoring and promoting archaeological fieldwork, providing resources for scholarly work, and disseminating the results of that research. Founded in 1881 as a platform for facilitating archaeological research of Classical Greece, the ASCSA’s mandate has grown to include all fields of Greek studies from antiquity to the present. Since its inception, the School’s academic programs and research facilities are supervised by an academic advisory body known as the Managing Committee, which consists of elected representatives from a consortium of more than 190 North American colleges and universities. The Board of Trustees, composed of distinguished women and men from the world of business, law, philanthropy, and academia, is responsible for the management of the School’s endowment, finances, and property, and has legal responsibility for the ASCSA.

Resources 
The Carl W. and Elizabeth P. Blegen Library contains over 105,000 volumes and nearly 700 periodicals, and covers all fields of classical antiquity, including literature, history, art, and archaeology. The Blegen is widely considered to be among the world’s best research collections for the field and hosts not only students and scholars of the ASCSA but also numerous Greek and other foreign scholars. 

The Gennadius Library covers the post-classical Greek world, specializing in the Byzantine, Ottoman, and contemporary periods. At its core is a collection of 26,000 rare books, manuscripts, archives, and works of art, which were presented to the School in 1922 by the diplomat and bibliophile Joannes Gennadius. The Gennadius Library now contains more than 140,000 volumes, including rare books and manuscripts, as well as current research resources.

The Archives of the ASCSA consist of the School’s administrative records, excavation records from American projects in Greece, and personal papers of eminent American scholars working in Greece. The Archives also curate collections of personal papers that contribute to an understanding of social, literary, historical, and political developments from the 18th to the 20th century in Greece and the Balkans. Collections include the papers of the Nobel prize-winning poets George Seferis and Odysseas Elytis, as well as Heinrich Schliemann and Lord Byron.

The Athenian Agora and Ancient Corinth are the School's two permanent excavation projects. These research facilities house the records as well as the artifacts from these two foundational excavation sites of the School. Both provide scholars with space for research as well as conservation and imaging services. Scholars working on projects related to various historical periods or the early beginnings of democracy often conduct research at these sites.

The Malcolm H. Wiener Laboratory for Archaeological Science was founded in 1992 to serve the interests of American, Greek and other archaeological scholars working in Greece through long-range, multidimensional research projects focused on human skeletal studies, faunal analysis, and a range of geoarchaeological and palaeoenvironmental research projects examining sediment, soil, lithic, ceramic, mortar/cement, pollen and palaeobotanical specimens. The geographical range of the research extends across the entire ancient Greek world and adjacent areas. Since it opened, the lab has financially supported and facilitated the independent research of over 100 scholars. Its facilities and equipment were designed to support the widest possible range of basic research consistent with the range of academic interests at the School. In 2016, the lab moved to its new free standing, three-level building which encompasses more than 8,600 square feet. The new lab includes state-of-the-art laboratories (chemistry, osteoarchaeology, zooarchaeology, environmental archaeology, and soil micromorphology) and cutting edge analytical equipment for sampling and analyzing organic and inorganic materials. It is one of the very few labs in Greece that can undertake large scale projects in the various fields of archaeological science and can provide the necessary infrastructure for the completion of these projects, including storage, strewing, working, and office space.

Archaeological projects
The ASCSA has been involved in a large number of archaeological projects, as well as a major program of primary archaeological publications. It is responsible for two of the most important archaeological sites in Greece, the Athenian Agora and Ancient Corinth.  The Corinth Excavations commenced in 1896 and have continued to present day with little interruption, and the Athenian Agora excavations first broke ground in 1932.  At both sites, the ASCSA operates important museums and extensive facilities for the study of the archaeological record.  Excavation records and artifacts are made available to wider audiences via ASCSA.net

Affiliated projects
Other archaeological projects with ASCSA involvement, past and present, include surveys in the Southern Argolid, in Messenia and at Vrokastro (Crete) and excavations at Olynthus (Greek Macedonia), Samothrace (North Aegean), the islet of Mitrou (Central Greece), Halai (Phthiotis), Isthmia, Kenchreai, Nemea, Sicyon (all in Corinthia), Lerna, Argos, Franchthi cave and Halieis (Argolid), Mt. Lykaion (Acadia), 
Nichoria and the Palace of Nestor at Pylos (Messenia), Haghia Irini (Keos), as well as Azoria, Mochlos, Gournia, Kavousi and Kommos on Crete.

Publications 
ASCSA publishes the peer-reviewed journal Hesperia quarterly as well as monographs for final reports of archaeological fieldwork conducted under School auspices, supplements to Hesperia, Gennadeion monographs; and miscellaneous volumes relating to the work of the School. These books range in format from large hardbacks to slim paperback guides.

List of directors

 William W. Goodwin (1882 to 1883); first director
 Lewis R. Packard (1883 to 1884)
 James Cooke Van Benschoten (1884 to 1885)
 Frederick De Forest Allen (1885 to 1886)
 Martin L. D'Ooge (1886 to 1887)
 Augustus C. Merriam (1887 to 1888)
 Charles Waldstein (1889 to 1892)
 Frank B. Tarbell (1892 to 1893)
 Rufus B. Richardson (1893 to 1903)
 Theodore Woolsey Heermance (1903 to 1905)
 William Nickerson Bates (1905 to 1906); acting
 Bert Hodge Hill (1906 to 1926)
 Carl Blegen (1926 to 1927); acting
 Rhys Carpenter (1927 to 1932)
 Richard Stillwell (1932 to 1935)
 Edward Capps (1935 to 1936)
 Charles Hill Morgan (1936 to 1938)
 Henry Lamar Crosby (1938 to 1939); acting
 Gorham Phillips Stevens (1939 to 1941)
 Arthur Wellesley Parsons (1941 to 1946); on leave for war service
 Gorham Phillips Stevens (1941 to 1947); acting
 Rhys Carpenter (1946 to 1948); not in residence
 Oscar Broneer (1947 to 1948); acting
 Carl Blegen (1948 to 1949)
 John Langdon Caskey (1949 to 1959)
 Henry S. Robinson (1959 to 1969)
 James Robert McCredie (1969 to 1977)
 Richard Stillwell (1974); acting
 Henry R. Immerwahr (1977 to 1982)
 Stephen G. Miller (1982 to 1987)
 William D. E. Coulson (1987 to 1997)
 James D. Muhly (1997 to 2002)
 Stephen V. Tracy (2002 to 2007)
 Jack L. Davis (2007 to 2012)
 James C. Wright (2012 to 2017)
 Jenifer Neils (2017 to 2022)
 Bonna Daix Wescoat (2022 to 2027)

List of Assistant Directors

 Carl Blegen (1920 to 1926)
 Benjamin Dean Meritt (1926 to 1928)
 Stephen Luce (1928 to 1929)
 Richard Stillwell (1931 to 1932)
 Charles Hill Morgan (1935 to 1936)
 Arthur Wellesley Parsons (1931 to 1941)
 John Langdon Caskey (1948 to 1949)
 Henry S. Robinson (1958 to 1959)
 Nick Blackwell (2012 to 2015)
 Dylan K. Rogers (2015 to 2019)
 Eric W. Driscoll (2019 to 2021)
 Simone Agrimonti (2021 to 2022)
 Carolin (Katie) Garcia Fine (2022 to present)

References

Bibliography
E. Korka et al. (eds.): Foreign Archaeological Schools in Greece, 160 Years, Athens, Hellenic Ministry of Culture, 2006, p. 18–29.
L. Lord:  A History of the American School of Classical Studies at Athens: An Intercollegiate Experiment, 1882–1942.
L. Shoe Meritt: A History of the American School of Classical Studies at Athens: 1939–1980.

External links
 ASCSA website
 AMBROSIA The Union Catalogue of the Blegen and Gennadius Libraries of the American School of Classical Studies at Athens and the Libraries of the British School at Athens 
 ASCSA.net Online database of the ASCSA
 ASCSA Publications
 The Archivist's Notebook
Papers of the American School of Classical Studies at Athens, digital reproduction Heidelberg University Library

 
Foreign Archaeological Institutes in Greece
American international schools in Greece
Classical educational institutes
Council of American Overseas Research Centers
Greece–United States relations
Organizations established in 1881
1881 establishments in Greece